Nuckols is an unincorporated community located in McLean County, Kentucky, United States.

A post office called Nuckols was established in 1895, and remained in operation until 1974.  The community has the name of Neverson Nuckols, an early settler.

References

Unincorporated communities in McLean County, Kentucky
Unincorporated communities in Kentucky